Ḥarrat Rahāṭ is a volcanic lava field in the Hejazi region of Saudi Arabia. In 1256 CE, a  lava flow erupted from six aligned scoria cones, and traveled  to within  of the Islamic holy city of Medina; this was its last eruption. There were earlier eruptions, such as in 641 CE, which made finger-like flows to the east of the 1256 CE flow. It is the biggest lava field in Saudi Arabia. Nearby is Al Wahbah crater.

There has been recent increase in seismic activitiy since 2009.

See also

 List of volcanoes in Saudi Arabia
 Sarat Mountains
 Hijaz Mountains

External links
Youtube video: The Active Volcano in Saudi Arabia; Harrat Rahat

References

Volcanoes of Saudi Arabia
Lava fields
Holocene volcanoes
Hejaz